Before John Was a Jazz Giant: A Song of John Coltrane is a children’s picture book by American author and critic Carole Boston Weatherford. It tells the story of a young John Coltrane growing up in the South in the 1930s. The book, published by Henry Holt in 2008, was illustrated by Sean Qualls.

Awards
Coretta Scott King Honor, Illustrator (2009)
American Library Association Notable Children's Books (2009)
NCSS-CBC Notable Trade Book in the Field of Social Studies (2009)
CPL: Chicago Public Library Best of the Best  (2009)
Michigan Great Lakes Great Books Award Master List (2009)
Golden Kite Honor Book, CCBC Choice (Univ. of WI) (2009)
Bank Street Best Children's Book of the Year (2009)
GA Picture Storybook Award ML (2012–2013)

References

2008 children's books
John Coltrane
American picture books
Books about musicians